Nav Ratan or Navratan (Hindi: नवरतन, or नव रतन, meaning "nine jewels") may refer to:

 Navaratnas, a group of nine extraordinary people in certain kings' courts in India
 Nav Rattan, an annual award for the worldwide Indian diaspora
 Navratan Bodh, instructions given in Mahaprabhu Shri Vallabhacharya ji's writings of the Hindu religious group Pushtimarg